Banyard is an unincorporated community in Winslow Township, Washington County, Arkansas, United States. It is located on Bunyard Road near the Crawford County line west of the Bobby Hopper Tunnel.

References

Unincorporated communities in Washington County, Arkansas
Unincorporated communities in Arkansas